Khooshe Talaee Sana Saveh Football Club (Bashgah-e Futbal-e Xushhe Tâlâiy Sena Saveh) is an Iranian football club based in Saveh, Iran who compete in Azadegan League.

Head coaches 
 Morteza Moradi (2016–2017)
 Kourosh Barmak (2017)
 Nasser Ebrahimi (2017)
 Mohsen Ashouri (2017–2020)
 Sohrab Bakhtiarizadeh (2020–2021)
 Vahid Bayatlou (2021–present)

Honors
League 2:
Winners (1): 2018–19

See also
 Hazfi Cup
 2018–19 Iran Football's 2nd Division

References

Football clubs in Iran
Association football clubs established in 2016
2016 establishments in Iran
Sport in Markazi Province